Ahmadabad (also Romanized as Aḩmadābād; also known as Hendābād (Persian: هند اباد) and Aḩmadābād-e Āstāneh) is a village in Astaneh Rural District, in the Central District of Roshtkhar County, Razavi Khorasan Province, Iran. At the 2006 census, its population was 2,774, in 691 families.

See also 

 List of cities, towns and villages in Razavi Khorasan Province

References 

Populated places in Roshtkhar County